Andriy Yanoshevych Kirlik (born 21 November 1974) is a Ukrainian football midfielder. He last played for Chornomorets in the Ukrainian Premier League, from 2003 to 2008. 
He was ordained as deacon by Metropolitan Agafangel (Savvin) of Odessa and Izmail in jurisdiction of the Ukrainian Orthodox Church (Moscow Patriarchate) on 7 March 2009.

External links 
Profile on Official Website
Full career statistics on Odessa Football website
 

Ukrainian footballers
1974 births
Living people
FC Chornomorets Odesa players
FC Arsenal Kyiv players
FC Kremin Kremenchuk players
FC Metalist Kharkiv players
FC Podillya Khmelnytskyi players
Sportspeople from Khmelnytskyi, Ukraine
Ukrainian Premier League players
Association football midfielders